Ponthieva petiolata is a species of orchid native to Cuba and the Lesser Antilles.

References

petiolata
Flora of Cuba
Flora of the Leeward Islands
Flora of the Windward Islands
Plants described in 1823
Flora without expected TNC conservation status